An All-American team is an honorary sports team composed of the best amateur players of a specific season for each team position—who in turn are given the honorific "All-America" and typically referred to as "All-American athletes", or simply "All-Americans". Although the honorees generally do not compete together as a unit, the term is used in U.S. team sports to refer to players who are selected by members of the national media.  Walter Camp selected the first All-America team in the early days of American football in 1889.  The 2022 NCAA Men's Basketball All-Americans are honorary lists that include All-American selections from the Associated Press (AP), the United States Basketball Writers Association (USBWA), Sporting News (SN), and the National Association of Basketball Coaches (NABC) for the 2021–22 NCAA Division I men's basketball season. All selectors choose three teams, while AP also lists honorable mention selections.

The Consensus 2022 College Basketball All-American team was determined by aggregating the results of the four major All-American teams as determined by the National Collegiate Athletic Association (NCAA). Since United Press International was replaced by SN in 1997, the four major selectors have been the aforementioned ones. AP has been a selector since 1948, NABC since 1957 and USBWA since 1960.  To earn "consensus" status, a player must win honors based on a point system computed from the four different all-America teams. The point system consists of three points for first team, two points for second team and one point for third team. No honorable mention or fourth team or lower are used in the computation. The top five totals plus ties are first team and the next five plus ties are second team.

Although the aforementioned lists are used to determine consensus honors, there are numerous other All-American lists. The ten finalists for the John Wooden Award are described as Wooden All-Americans. The ten finalists for the Senior CLASS Award are described as Senior All-Americans.  Other All-American lists include those determined by USA Today, Fox Sports, Yahoo Sports and many others. The scholar-athletes selected by the College Sports Information Directors of America (CoSIDA) are termed Academic All-Americans.

2022 Consensus All-America team

PG – Point guard
SG – Shooting guard
PF – Power forward
SF – Small forward
C – Center

Individual All-America teams

By player

By team

AP Honorable Mention:

 Max Abmas, Oral Roberts
 Armando Bacot, North Carolina
 Tari Eason, LSU
 Zach Edey, Purdue
 Ron Harper Jr., Rutgers
 Johnny Juzang, UCLA
 David Roddy, Colorado State
 Alondes Williams, Wake Forest

Academic All-Americans
The College Sports Information Directors of America (CoSIDA) announced its 15-member 2021 Academic All-America team on March 15, 2022, divided into first, second and third teams, with Ben Vander Plas of Ohio chosen as men's college basketball Academic All-American of the Year.

Senior All-Americans
The 10 finalists for the Senior CLASS Award, called Senior All-Americans, were announced on February 10, 2022. The first and second teams were announced on April 1, with Jacob Gilyard of Richmond named as the recipient.

First team

Second team

References

All-Americans
NCAA Men's Basketball All-Americans